Karl Schäfer may refer to:

Karl Schäfer (figure skater), Austrian figure skater and swimmer
Karl Schäfer (SS-Brigadeführer), German SS officer
Karl Emil Schäfer, German pilot in the first world war

See also
Karl Schaefer, American television producer